Bni Chegdale is an Arab town and rural commune in Fquih Ben Salah Province, Béni Mellal-Khénifra, Morocco. At the time of the 2004 census, the commune had a total population of 11,582 people living in 1872 households.

References

Populated places in Fquih Ben Salah Province
Rural communes of Béni Mellal-Khénifra